Kentucky Route 922 (KY 922) is a  long state highway in northern Kentucky. The southern terminus of the route is at U.S. Route 27 and U.S. Route 68 in Lexington. The northern terminus is at Kentucky Route 620 north of Georgetown. From US 27/68 north to US 25, KY 922 is named Oliver Lewis Way. From US 25 north to U.S. Route 62, it is named Newtown Pike. Between New Circle Rd (KY 4) and Interstate 75, Newtown Pike is one of the most congested routes during rush hour.

Route description
The road begins not far from downtown Lexington as a four-lane road. It soon passes by the world headquarters of Lexmark immediately before the road's interchange with New Circle Road, Lexington's circular beltway. From New Circle Road, it remains a four-lane arterial until it reaches Interstate 64/75 at the northern edge of urban Lexington. It then becomes a scenic two-lane road for the remainder of its length.

Major intersections

References

Further reading
KentuckyRoads.com KY 922
Kentucky Route 922 at UrbanUp

0922
Transportation in Lexington, Kentucky
Transportation in Scott County, Kentucky